Andrija Ljudevit Adamić (29 November 1766 – 31 October 1828) was a Croatian trader from the City of Fiume, builder, supporter of economical and cultural development.

Adamich was born into a wealthy Jewish family of Simon Adamić, tobacco merchant and large estates owner. Adamich was the founder and owner of many factories and manufacturers (paper, liquor, rope, etc.), and a shipowner.

He co-founded the Fiume-based firm Simone Adamich e Figlio ('Simone Adamich & Son') with his father in 1786 and worked there until 1800.

As the building chancellor of the Fiume Gubernium in 1790, he tried to transform Fiume into a modern city. His works on the plan of urbanism are also noted. In 1805 he financed and built a theatre with a capacity of 1,600 people, which was subsequently razed.

After the Napoleonic Wars, Fiume harbour was blocked, and the city was upon the brink of starvation when the English and French navies left. Adamich managed to revive the city's economy, and allowed it to prosper and evolve fully in the age of industrial revolution.

He represented Fiume at the Congress of Verona in 1822 and the Bratislava Assembly in 1824-25.

Adamich was a visionary, and a great man in history of Fiume. He spoke 6 languages, and had a vast influence in political and merchant circles.

The Formula One racing driver Andrea de Adamich is a distant descendant.

Sources
 Časopis za ekonomsku povijest Jugoslavije (1982)
 Kobler, Giovanni Memorie per la storia della liburnica città di Fiume (1896)

References

Bibliography

 

1766 births
1828 deaths
Businesspeople from Rijeka
Politicians from Rijeka
19th-century Italian Jews
19th-century Italian businesspeople
18th-century businesspeople of the Holy Roman Empire
Economy of Rijeka
Croatian Jews
Croatian businesspeople
19th-century Croatian people
18th-century Croatian people
Italian people of Croatian descent